Francouvertes is an annual music festival in Montreal, Quebec, Canada, which spotlights emerging francophone musical artists from Quebec.

At the end of each year's festival, three finalists are named, following which a jury presents an award of $10,000 to an artist chosen as the best artist of the festival.

Winners
Following are the winners and first and second runners-up of each year's event.

1995
 Sylvie Royer
8e porte à gauche
Les Tchigaboux

1996
 Jocelyn Bigras
Garnote
Danielle Richard et sa cage de bruits

1997
 Ivy
Sara Vafaï
WD-40

1999
 Apogée
Gwenwed
Le Quartier des papillons souterrains

2000
 Loco Locass
Gaétan Leboeuf
Les Cowboys Fringants

2001
 La Chango Family
?Alice!
Hugo Bonneville

2002
 Kulcha Connection
Karlof Orchestra
Karkwa

2003
 Syncop
Les Breastfeeders
Les Goules

2005
 Damien Robitaille
Caniche Hara-Kiri
Masse Poésie

2006
 Ma blonde est une chanteuse
David Marin
Mathieu Mathieu

2007
 Mimosa
Émilie Proulx
Deya

2008
 La Patère Rose
Le Citoyen
Bonjour Brumaire

2009
 Ariel
Francis d'Octobre
Mad'Moizèle Giraf

2010
 Bernard Adamus
Monogrenade
Alex Nevsky

2011
 Chloé Lacasse
Canailles
Karim Ouellet

2012
 Les sœurs Boulay
Francis Faubert
Gazoline

2013
 Les Hay Babies
Dead Obies
Marcie

2014
 Philippe Brach
Julie Blanche
Deux pouilles en cavale

2015
 Dylan Perron et Élixir de Gumbo
C-Antoine Gosselin
Émile Bilodeau

2016
 La Famille Ouellette
Caltâr-Bateau
Mon Doux Saigneur

2017
 Lydia Képinski
Les Louanges
Laurence-Anne

2018
 LaF
Lou-Adriane Cassidy
CRABE

2019
 Original Gros Bonnet
Alex Burger
P'tit Belliveau et les Grosses Coques

2020
 Valence
Ariane Roy
Narcisse

2021
 Étienne Coppée
Calamine
Ambre ciel

2022
 Rau Ze
Hôte
Émile Bourgault

References

External links
Francouvertes

Canadian music awards
Music festivals in Montreal
Awards established in 1995
Recurring events established in 1995
Music competitions in Canada
Pop music festivals in Canada
1995 establishments in Quebec